Ala'ab Damanhour Sporting Club, is an Egyptian football club based in Damanhour, Egypt. The club is currently playing in the Egyptian three Division, the three-highest league in the Egyptian football league system.

History
Ala'ab Damanhour participated in only five seasons in the Egyptian Premier League, most recently in 2014–15.

References

Egyptian Second Division
Football clubs in Egypt